The 2012–13 Houston Baptist Huskies men's basketball team represented Houston Baptist University in the 2012–13 college basketball season. This was head coach Ron Cottrell's twenty-second season at HBU. The Huskies played their home games at the Sharp Gymnasium and were members of the Great West Conference. They finished the season 14–17, 3–5 in Great West play to finish in a three way tie for third place. They advanced to the championship game of the Great West tournament where they lost to Chicago State.

This was the Huskies final season as members of the Great West, as Houston Baptist will join the Southland Conference for the 2013 season.

Media
All Houston Baptist games will be broadcast on the radio and online live by Legacy Sports Network (LSN). LSN will also provide online video for every Huskies home game.

Roster

Schedule and results
Source

|-
!colspan=12 style=| Exhibition

|-
!colspan=12 style=|Regular Season

|-
!colspan=12 style=| Great West tournament

References

Houston Christian Huskies men's basketball seasons
Houston Baptist
Hou
Hou